The Kogŏnwŏn Line is a non-electrified standard-gauge secondary line of the Korean State Railway in Kyŏngwon County, North Hamgyŏng Province, running from Singŏn on the Hambuk Line to Kogŏnwŏn.

Route
A yellow background in the "Distance" box indicates that section of the line is not electrified.

References

Railway lines in North Korea
Standard gauge railways in North Korea